"All These Niggas" is a song by American rapper King Von featuring American rapper Lil Durk. It was released on August 5, 2020 as the second single from Von's debut studio album Welcome to O'Block (2020). The song was produced by Chopsquad DJ.

Composition 
In the song, Von and Durk rap about the "bleak" reality of living in the streets over a drill instrumental with "eerie piano keys".

Music video 
A music video was released alongside the single. It was directed by JV Visuals 312, and finds King Von on his block with a white Rolls-Royce and diamond chains as he raps. Because he and Lil Durk could not legally be together, Durk did not appear in the video.

Charts

Certifications

References 

2020 singles
2020 songs
Empire Distribution singles
King Von songs
Lil Durk songs
Songs written by Lil Durk